Fanaa is a 2010 drama film directed by Aishath Rishmy. Produced by Aminath Rasheedha under Yaaraa Productions, the film stars Rasheedha, Rishmy and Ahmed Azmeel. The film was released on 14 July 2010. It is the second film from Yaaraa Productions after 2006's horror film Hukuru Vileyrey. It is Azmeel's first appearance in a feature film. It was based on a novel published by Ibrahim Waheed titled Balgish.

Cast 
 Aminath Rasheedha as Zahira
 Aishath Rishmy as Mamdhooha "Mandhi"
 Ahmed Azmeel as Aadhan "Aadey"
 Ismail Aziel Azumeel as Zellu
 Zeenath Abbas as Neetha
 Aminath Shareef as Athifa
 Roanu Hassan Manik as Mamdhooha's Father
 Hussain Solah as Ahusan
 Ahmed Saeed as Fahud
 Mariyam Azza (Special appearance in "Dhopatta")

Soundtrack

Release and reception
Upon release, the film received mixed to negative reviews from critics. Ali Naafiz from Haveeru Daily classified the film as the "worst Maldivian film released so far" during the year, criticing the performance of the lead. However, other critics found the performance of Rishmy and Rasheedha to be on a "standing ovation" level, though they were displeased with the length of the film.

Accolades

References

2010 films
Yaaraa Productions films
2010 drama films
Maldivian drama films
Dhivehi-language films